The Riverbank Publications are a series of pamphlets written by the people who worked for millionaire George Fabyan in the multi-discipline research facility he built in the early 20th century near Chicago. They were published by Fabyan, often without author credit. The publications on cryptanalysis, mostly written by William Friedman, with contributions from Elizebeth Smith Friedman and others, are considered seminal in the field. In particular, Publication 22 introduced the Index of Coincidence, a powerful statistical tool for cryptanalysis.

List of publications on cryptography
The Riverbank Publications dealt with many subjects investigated at the laboratories. The ones dealing with cryptography began with number 15,
 and consists of:
 15, A Method of Reconstructing the Primary Alphabet From a Single One of the Series of Secondary Alphabets, 1917
 16, Methods for the Solution of Running-Key Ciphers, 1918
 17, An Introduction to Methods for the Solution of Ciphers, 1918
 18, Synoptic Tables for the Solution of Ciphers and A Bibliography of Cryptographic Literature, 1918 
 19, Formulae for the Solution of Geometrical Transposition Ciphers, written with Capt. Lenox R. Lohr, 1918
 20, Several Machine Ciphers and Methods for their Solution, 1918
 21, Methods for the Reconstruction of Primary Alphabets, written with Elizebeth Smith Friedman, 1918
 22, The Index of Coincidence and Its Applications in Cryptography, imprint L. Fournier, Paris, 1922
 50, The production and detection of messages in concealed writing and images, by H. O. Nolan, 1918
 75, Memorization Methods: Specifically Illustrated in Respect to Their Applicability to Codes and Topographic Material, by H. O. Nolan, 1919,

Except as noted, the above publications were written by William F. Friedman and were published by George Fabyan's Riverbank Laboratories in Geneva, Illinois.

References

Cryptography books
World War I-related lists
Cryptographic attacks
Riverbank Laboratories